Albert Hall (born March 7, 1958) is an American former professional baseball player who played the majority of his Major League career for the Atlanta Braves. Hall appeared in a total of 375 games played in the National League between 1981 and 1989; 355 of those games were as a member of the Braves.  He added twenty games to his MLB résumé at the end of his career with the  Pittsburgh Pirates.

Career
He was selected by the Braves in the sixth round of the 1977 Major League Baseball Draft out of Birmingham's Jones Valley High School. After spending his first two professional seasons in Rookie ball, Hall quickly developed a reputation as a prolific base stealer in minor league baseball. In successive seasons, he stole 66 (1979), 100 (1980), 60 (1981) and 62 (1982) bases at progressively higher levels of the Braves' farm system. Then, in 1986, he stole 72 bases for the Triple-A Richmond Braves.

His finest big league season was 1987, when he set MLB-career highs in games played (92), runs scored (54), hits (83), doubles (20),  triples (4), home runs (three), runs batted in (24), stolen bases (33), and batting average .284. On September 23, he became the first Atlanta Brave to hit for the cycle, becoming the first player in franchise history to do so since Bill Collins in 1910.

During his MLB career, Hall stole 67 bases and was caught stealing 29 times (.698).  In the minors, he had 455 thefts in 566 attempts (.803).

See also
 List of Major League Baseball players to hit for the cycle

References

Further reading

External links
, or Retrosheet, or Pelota Binaria (Venezuelan Winter League)

1958 births
Living people
African-American baseball players
Atlanta Braves players
Baseball players from Birmingham, Alabama
Buffalo Bisons (minor league) players
Cardenales de Lara players
American expatriate baseball players in Venezuela
Durham Bulls players
Greenwood Braves players
Gulf Coast Braves players
Kingsport Braves players
Major League Baseball outfielders
Pittsburgh Pirates players
Richmond Braves players
Savannah Braves players
21st-century African-American people
20th-century African-American sportspeople